The 2021 season is São Paulo's 92nd season in the club's history and their 61st in the top-flight of Brazilian football. Along with Série A, São Paulo will also compete in the Campeonato Paulista, Copa do Brasil and Copa Libertadores.

First-team squad

Youth players with first team numbers

Other players under contract

Out on loan

Retired numbers 
 01 –  Rogério Ceni, Goalkeeper (1990–2015)

Transfers

Transfers in

Loans in

Transfers out

Loans out

Statistics

Overall

{|class="wikitable"
|-
|Games played || 70 (16 Campeonato Paulista, 6 Copa do Brasil, 10 Copa Libertadores, 38 Campeonato Brasileiro)
|-
|Games won || 29 (11 Campeonato Paulista, 3 Copa do Brasil, 4 Copa Libertadores, 11 Campeonato Brasileiro)
|-
|Games drawn || 24 (4 Campeonato Paulista, 1 Copa do Brasil, 4 Copa Libertadores, 15 Campeonato Brasileiro)
|-
|Games lost || 17 (1 Campeonato Paulista, 2 Copa do Brasil, 2 Copa Libertadores, 12 Campeonato Brasileiro)
|-
|Goals scored || 101
|-
|Goals conceded || 68
|-
|Goal difference || +33
|-
|Best results  || 9–1 (H) v 4 de Julho - Copa do Brasil - 2021.06.08
|-
|Worst result || 1–5 (A) v Flamengo - Série A - 2021.07.25
|-
|Top scorer || Pablo (13 goals)
|-

Goalscorers

Managers performance

Competitions

Overview

Campeonato Paulista

Group B

Matches

Quarter-final

Semi-final

Final

Copa Libertadores

The draw for the group stage was held on 9 April 2021, 12:00 PYST (UTC−4), at the CONMEBOL Convention Centre in Luque, Paraguay.

Round of 16 

The draw for the round of 16 was held on 1 June 2021.

Quarter-finals

Série A

League table

Results summary

Results by round

Matches
The league fixtures were announced on 24 March 2021.

Copa do Brasil

Third round

Round of 16

Quarter-finals

References

External links

São Paulo FC seasons
São Paulo FC